João Pedro Ferreira (born 20 October 1986) is a Portuguese former athlete who competed primarily in the 400 metres hurdles. He represented his country in the 4 × 100 metres relay at the 2011 World Championships without qualifying for the final.

International competitions

Personal bests

Outdoor
100 metres – 10.70 (0.0 m/s, Leiria 2009)
200 metres – 21.03 (+0.7 m/s, Lisbon 2008)
400 metres – 46.66 (Leiria 2009)
110 metres hurdles – 13.97 (+1.1 m/s, Budapest 2010)
400 metres hurdles – 49.63 (Shenzen 2011)
Indoor
60 metres – 6.95 (Espinho 2007)
200 metres – 21.55 (Pombal 2010)
400 metres – 48.00 (Pombal 2011)
60 metres hurdles – 7.98 (Espinho 2006)

References

1986 births
Living people
Portuguese male sprinters
Portuguese male hurdlers
Athletes from Lisbon
Competitors at the 2011 Summer Universiade